Mokrý Háj is a village and municipality in Skalica District in the Trnava Region of western Slovakia.

History 
In historical records the village was first mentioned in 1569.

Geography 
The municipality lies at an altitude of 261 metres and covers an area of 6.871 km². It has a population of about 623 people.

References

External links 

 Official page
 https://web.archive.org/web/20080111223415/http://www.statistics.sk/mosmis/eng/run.html

Villages and municipalities in Skalica District